The 1980 Independence Bowl was a college football postseason bowl game between the McNeese State Cowboys and the Southern Miss Golden Eagles.

Background
Once again, the Cowboys were champions of the Southland Conference and were thus invited to their third Independence bowl in four years. The Golden Eagles were in their first bowl game since 1958. This was the final year of the agreement between the Bowl and the Southland Conference.

Game summary
Winston Walker gave the Golden Eagles a 3–0 lead on his 36-yard field goal. Cleom Terrell made it 10–0 on his 14-yard run for a touchdown. The Cowboys responded in the next two quarters with a Buford Jordan touchdown run and a Stephan Starring touchdown run to give them a 14–10 lead going into the final quarter. Mike Woodard gave Southern Miss the go-ahead lead on his one-yard touchdown plunge as the Golden Eagles held on to win. Despite outgaining Southern Miss on yards, the Cowboys' four turnovers (compared to Southern Miss' two) doomed the team. In an MVP (but losing) effort, Stephen Starring threw 6-of-12 for 129 yards and ran for 82 yards on 23 carries for McNeese State.

Aftermath
McNeese State did not win another conference title until 1991, but by this point the conference had dropped below Division I-A (now FBS). This remains their final bowl game. Southern Miss returned to the Independence Bowl in 1988.

Statistics

References

Independence Bowl
Independence Bowl
McNeese Cowboys football bowl games
Southern Miss Golden Eagles football bowl games
December 1980 sports events in the United States
Independence Bowl